Palm Tree Mosque, or the Church of Jan van Bougies, or the Dadelboom Mosque, is a former residence and current mosque in Long Street, Cape Town, South Africa. It is the oldest substantially unaltered building in Long Street. 

The building stands on land once owned by Hermanus Smuts, south-west of a block of land granted to him in 1751. The grant was bounded by Long, Leeuwen and Keerom Streets. After his wife died in 1754, portions of the property were sold off. At the time the property had stables on it. It was purchased by one J. M. Vogel and again, after Vogel's death in 1777, by Baron Willem Ferdinand van Reede van Oudtshoorn. In 1782 it was transferred to one of his sons. Successive owners were Daniel Hugo (1785), Daniel Krynauw (1786) and Carel Lodewijk Schot (1787).

Schot went bankrupt, but is probably responsible for building the first residence in about 1788. The property was bought by J. P. Roux in 1790. Freed slaves Jan van Bougies and Frans van Bengalen bought the property in 1807 and Jan van Bougies became the sole owner in 1811. Jan and Frans, along with some followers, broke away from the Auwal Mosque, when the former failed to succeed as imam. When Jan van Bougies died in 1846, aged 112, he left the property to his wife Samida of the Cape, but specified that it continue to operate as a mosque, the second oldest in Cape Town.

The second storey was presumable added after the house had been turned into a mosque some time between 1811 and 1821. There was once a garden in front of the house, in which two palm trees grew. The low sash window and shortened door are not by design; Long Street was raised over the years.

Gallery

References

Houses completed in 1788
Mosques in Cape Town
Religious buildings and structures completed in 1788
History of Cape Town
1788 establishments in the Cape Colony
18th-century mosques
18th-century architecture in South Africa